Curlew was built in 1856 as a wooden-hulled propeller freight boat for the run between Providence, Rhode Island and New York. She served in several capacities during the American Civil War.

Merchant service

The  wooden propeller steamer Curlew, was built in 1856 by Samuel Sneden of Greenpoint, New York for the Commercial Steamboat Company of Providence, Rhode Island. The boiler was on the main deck. Curlew was rigged as a three-masted schooner as were many of the propeller steamers in this service. She was configured with a full length spar deck which was enclosed above the main deck.

Curlew sank off of Point Judith, Rhode Island in May 1859 when a steam pipe burst and she began to fill with water.  She was salvaged and a new boiler and engine were installed in 1860.

Civil War service

Curlew was purchased for $44,000 by the U.S. Navy in 1861 during the American Civil War for the South Atlantic Blockading Squadron. She was outfitted as a gunboat with armament consisting of a 30-pounder rifled gun on the foredeck and six 32-pounder smoothbores on the main deck. Curlew participated in the expedition to Port Royal, South Carolina under the command of Acting Lieutenant P.G. Watmough. When her machinery proved to be inadequate she was towed to New York by the transport Baltic arriving on 21 November 1861 to be returned to her owners before the sixty-day trial period expired.

Curlew was chartered by the Quartermaster's Department in October 1862 and voyaged as far as New Orleans, Louisiana under Captain H.N. Parrish.

In the panic over the commerce raider , Curlew was again chartered in June 1863 for use as a gunboat, this time by the Navy Department. She was returned in October of that year.

Final voyage

Back in commercial service Curlew inaugurated a freight service between New York and Baltimore, Maryland. She cleared Baltimore on 5 November 1863 and proceeded down the bay for New York with a full cargo. Near midnight on a dark, cloudy night she collided with the northbound steamer Louisiana near Point Lookout, Maryland hitting Louisiana near midships on the port side. Curlew sank but Captain Parrish and the crew rowed to safety at Point Lookout.  Louisiana suffered damage and was towed to Baltimore.

Notes on tonnage

Curlew was listed in the Custom House Register in Providence at 343 tons burden. The register dimensions shown in the box also result in that number when entered in the contemporary tonnage equation. The New York Marine Register and the succeeding American Lloyds Register both show 380 tons. The Navy appears to quote 380 tons from those registers. In February 1862 the registration was changed to New York and the tonnage remeasured at 557.

Other vessels

A ferryboat Curlew of 392 tons, which was built in 1853, was purchased by the Quartermaster's Department for use during the Civil War.

References

Steamships of the United States
Merchant ships of the United States
1856 ships
Ships built in Brooklyn
Maritime incidents in November 1863
Shipwrecks in the Chesapeake Bay
Ships sunk in collisions